Diretório Monárquico do Brasil (English: Brazilian Monarchical Directory) was a monarchical institution established in Rio de Janeiro in 1890, one year after the proclamation of the republic, by Afonso Celso de Assis Figueirado, The Viscount of Ouro Preto, the last Prime Minister of the Empire of Brazil, entrusted by the former Princess Regent Isabel, to whom they considered Empress of Brazil after the death of their father Pedro II, in 1891, to organize the actions of Brazilian monarchists. The organization was constituted as an unofficial representation of the deposed heiress to the throne of Brazil and also functioned as a council.

During its existence, the Monarchic Directory started as an illegal institution until the beginning of the civil republican government, acting throughout the country through a network composed of nobles, members of civil society and intellectuals and former loyalist politicians of the empire such as the also former Prime Minister João Alfredo Correia de Oliveira, actively trying to manipulate and influence Brazilian political life. Although not considered a parallel government, the Monarchic Directory reported and acted in accordance with the exiled imperial family, acted in accordance with the laws of the empire's constitution of 1824 and was responsible for the monarchist acts present in various events in Brazilian history, such as in the resignation of Deodoro da Fonseca and in the Revolta da Armada. It was also in the institution's headquarters that Pedro de Alcântara, Prince of Grão-Pará, son of Isabel, signed his official resignation, which was issued by the directory itself.

With old age and Isabel's increasing distance during and after the First World War, the directory was informally dissolved with the end of its political activities, eventually leading to the formation of other monarchist organizations, these without official sponsorship of the Imperial Family such as the Brazilian Patrianovist Imperial Action.

History

Foundation Manifesto
In 1890, the Viscount of Ouro Preto issued the manifesto that created the directory:

"The Brazilian republic, as it was proclaimed, is a coup, a work of iniquity. The republic has risen on the bucklers of the mutinous soldiery, comes from a criminal origin, was carried out by means of an attack unprecedented in history and shall have an ephemeral existence!"

Action on Prince Pedro's resignation
In 1908, when Prince Pedro de Alcântara signed his instrument of resignation, supposedly under pressure from his mother, in order to marry a Bohemian noblewoman, his mother Isabel, in the capacity of Head of the Imperial House of Brazil and recognized by the Monarchic Directory as Empress of Brazil, hastened to communicate the fact to them, sending it, in a letter of November 9, 1908, one of three copies of the resignation document.

The Monarchic Directory was the body entrusted by the Head of the Imperial House to guide the actions of the monarchists in Brazil. Established in 1890, as a sort of unofficial representation of the heir to the abolished throne for political purposes, it was also, to a certain extent, an advisory body that the former Princess Regente Isabel used to listen to when it came to Brazilian affairs. With only the powers delegated by the Head of the Imperial House, did not formally constitute a government-in-exile, but functioned as a continuing representation of the monarchy. In such a way, it was not up to the Monarchic Directory to accept or refuse the actions of the Head of the House, only to observe, advise, and make them public in Brazilian territory, always working with observance to the government in order to advance the cause of monarchical restoration politically.

Composition
The Monarchic Directory had representations in all states of Brazil at the time, and its nucleus was composed of former Empire politicians such as former Prime Ministers, ministers, senators, nobles, journalists, abolitionists and members of the intellectuals of the time. Stand out the ex-prime ministers Viscount of Ouro Preto, João Alfredo Correia de Oliveira and Lafayette Rodrigues Pereira, Carlos de Laet, Domingos de Andrade Figueira, Amador da Cunha Bueno, among others.

References

Bibliography 

 
 Causa Imperial: http://causaimperial.com.br/822/

External Links

Monarchist organizations
Monarchism in Brazil